Elections for the House of Representatives of the Philippines were held on November 11, 1969. Held on the same day as the presidential election, the party of the incumbent president, Ferdinand Marcos's Nacionalista Party, won a majority of the seats in the House of Representatives.

The elected representatives served in the 7th Congress from 1969 to 1973, although it was cut short due to the proclamation of martial law on September 23, 1972 by President Marcos. The proclamation suspended the Constitution and closed both chambers of Congress, which enabled Marcos to rule by decree. The Constitutional Convention then passed a new constitution, which was approved by the electorate in a 1973 plebiscite that abolished the bicameral Congress and instead instituted a unicameral Batasang Pambansa (National Assembly).

Results

 Others
No seats won: 0.43% (white)

See also
7th Congress of the Philippines

References

  

1969
1969 elections in the Philippines